Nenad Joldeski is a Macedonian writer. He was born in Struga in 1986. He studied economics in Skopje, and then obtained a master's degree in comparative literature. He has published two collections of short stories The Silence of Enhalon (2009) and Each with Their Own Lake (2012). The latter won the EU Prize for Literature. In 2018 he published a novella titled Swimming Upstream. He has also edited a short story collection dedicated to Dr Nikola Nezlobinski titled Nikolaj (Fiction. Water. Truth).

References

Macedonian writers
1986 births
Living people